Altar Ego is the debut studio album by South African hip hop recording artist and record producer AKA. The album was released on August 23, 2011, through The Vth Season.

Promotion 
AKA kicked off the album launch for Altar Ego at the Alba Lounge, V&A Waterfront in his birth-town Cape Town. He embarked on a nationwide tour in promotion of his album. Nasty C was his opening act during the Durban Leg of his tour.

Accolades
At 2012 South African Music Awards Altar Ego won two awards  for Male Artist of the Year and Best Street urban Music Album. 

|-
|rowspan="2"|2012
|rowspan="2"|Altar Ego
|Best Street Urban Music Album
|
|-
|Male Artist of the Year
|

Track list

References 

AKA (rapper) albums
2011 debut albums
Albums produced by Kiernan Forbes
Tswana-language albums
Zulu-language albums